Sulayman Pasha al-Khadem Mosque, also known as Sariat al-Jabal Mosque, is a historical mosque established in 1528 by Suleiman Pasha Al-Khadem, one of the Ottoman rulers of Egypt. It is located inside the Cairo Citadel at the top of Mount Mokattam, and originally erected for the use of the janissaries stationed in the northern enclosure. It is the first mosque established in Egypt in Ottoman architectural style.

History

Patron and Founder: Suleiman Pasha Al-Khadem 
Suleiman Pasha Al-Khadem, also known as Hadim Suleiman Pasha, was a prominent statesman during the Ottoman Empire. Prior to his rise, many believed that no statesman would be able to replace Ibrahim Pasha; he was regarded as an excellent leader who handled affairs of state with ease and agency. Yet, after the death of Ibrahim Pasha, Hadim Suleiman Pasha was able to gain similar amounts of prominence, rising through the ranks due to his focus on establishing control of the Red Sea and the Persian Gulf.

Fatimid Caliphate 
The mosque was built on the ruins of an old mosque of Abu Mansur Qusta, built by the governor of Alexandria during the Fatimid period in 1141 and existed since before the construction of the citadel. The new mosque was the result of a complete renovation and restoration programme on the site of the old mosque.

Ottoman Empire 
The mosque of Suleiman Pasha was built in 1528 after the first renovation of the citadel. Suleiman Pasha became governor of Egypt in the 15th century. The new building expressed the power of Suleiman Pasha. Suleiman Pasha had people to create the mosque, which includes Egyptian craftsmen and an architect.

The Sulayman Pasha mosque is one example of the synthesis of architectural innovations that occurred in Egypt during the Ottoman Empire. Both indirect and direct architectural innovations from the Ottoman period were visible throughout Egypt. The golden age of the Ottoman Empire, in particular, led to the rise of the architect, Mimar Sinan, who introduced many innovative designs that inspired the rest of the Islamic world and architecture more generally. 

Before the Ottoman period began, the Mamluk style heavily influenced mosque architecture. While other areas in the Islamic world, such as then-Syria, were able to embrace the presence of the Ottoman style, it was not easy for Egypt to directly embrace and incorporate Ottoman elements at first. This was because Egypt, and Cairo in particular, was the center for the Mamluk Sultanate's golden age. As a result, when the Sulayman Pasha mosque was built, it incorporated both elements from both Ottoman and Cairene architecture.

19th Century 
While light restorations likely took place, the overall scheme of the mosque is original. Until restoration in the 19th century, a large model boat hung within the arcades adjoining the tomb of the mosque. The model boat was a reference to Pharaonic burial customs.

Architecture

Interior 
The mosque is in the T-form variant, which is a distinct Ottoman design. The mosque consists of two sections, and covered with a dome in the center surrounded by semi-domes decorated with colored inscriptions. It is a prominent Ottoman architectural design. The domes of the mosque are all covered with green qashani geographic patterns. The central dome rests on spherical pendentives and includes vegetal decoration.

The mosque consists of two sections. The entrance of the mosque leads directly to into the first half of the mosque: the prayer hall. This hall is flanked by three-semi domes, which open to a central courtyard. On the first section, the decorations are interspersed with various writings, and marble walls covering the bottom ends with a strip of Kufi line and flowered Qur'anic verses. At the middle of the eastern wall, there exists mihrab and a marble platform. Specifically in this area, there are two iwans: on the first iwan, there are decorations interspersed with various writings that also include Qur'anic verses. 

One of the Qur'anic verses being a handsome inscription encircles the dome, a prominent and elevated place for the written word, the basis of the Universal Law of Islam, (Quran 3:189-194):

"To God belongs the Kingdom of the heavens and of the earth; and God is powerful over everything.

Surely in the creation of the heavens and earth and in the alternation of night and day there are signs for men possessed of minds who remember God;

Standing and sitting on their sides, And reflect upon the creation of the heavens and the earth:

'Our Lord, Thou has not created this for vanity, Glory be to Thee!

Guard us against the chastisement of the Fire.

Our Lord, whomsoever Thou admittest into the Fire, Thou wilt have abased; and the evildoers shall have no helpers.

Our Lord, we have heard a caller calling us to belief, saying, "Believe you in your Lord!" And we believe.

Our Lord, forgive Thou us our sins and acquit us of our evil deeds, and take us to Thee with the pious.

Our Lord, give us what Thou has promised us by Thy Messengers, and abase us not on the Day of Resurrection:

Thou wilt not fail the tryst." 

These Qur'anic verses are engraved in kufic script in black on white marble, which was a technique taken from the Mamluk period. The first iwan also has the mihrab and a marble platform. The second iwan has a minbar with various vegetal leaf designs.

The western wall leads to the second section of the mosque, which faces the qibla.  The front of this wall has the dikkat al-muballigh, or the elevated platform designed to call people for worship. The dikkat al-muballigh is supported by wooden brackets. Parts of the inner walls also have marble dadoes, which were a key part of Mamluk architecture. Above the dado, there exists curved marble inlaid with paste. There is also a marble pulpit, which is carved and painted, located on top of the conical top inside the mosque. The interior has a marble floor, which also has geometric patterns. Taking a broader view, the second section is an open middle sahn whose floor is decorated with colored marble. It is surrounded by four arches covered by semi-domes, which are mounted on its shoulders, and on the western side of the courtyard is a small dome with several tombs with marble structures. Tombs are covered with different models of headstone that were prevalent at the time.

Minaret 
The minaret is located to the left of the entrance of the mosque. It is made of stone, and is cited as one of the most elegant minarets in Cairo. The shaft of the minaret is very tall, standing at two times the height of the tallest mosque wall. The minaret is mainly in the style of Ottoman architecture, presenting a cylindrical faceted shaft with a conical finial. In addition, the minaret has two balconies. Each balcony juts out from the body and is adorned and supported by three tiers of multicolored muqarnas. The two balconies also have various carvings on them, a distinct trait of Mamluk architecture. The balconies also have wooden railings. 

The exterior of the minaret also has three rings of blind arches below the cap of the minaret and below the two balconies. In addition, beneath the first balcony, there are two rings of horizontal moldings. On top of the minaret, there is a cone covered with green panels. These panels were produced in the ceramic workshop of Sultan Qansuh al-Ghawri. Notably, there have been similar tiles spotted in Shahin al-Khalwati mosque. This type of minaret was used in most of the mosques established during the Ottoman era.

The minaret is cylindrical with two ribs, each jutting out from the body and adorned with multicolored muqarnas. It is topped with a cone covered with green panels. This type of Ottoman minaret was used in most of the mosques established during the Ottoman era.

Outside the Mosque 

In the outside of the mosque, the building is in the shape of a rectangle. It depicts 9 smaller domes on the rest of the building. The front door brings the person in the center of the rectangle, which shows the prayer hall. With the rectangular shape of the building, it also includes the courtyard. Another courtyard is located in the northern side. Its walls that are made out of marble were done from the work of Egyptian craftsmen.

Courtyard 
The courtyard outside of the mosque is also paved with marble.  This courtyard is surrounded by shallow domes, which are decorated with green tiles. 

The courtyard has a shrine from the Fatimid period, which was created by Abu Mansur Qastah Ghulam al-Muzaffar ibn Amir al-Juyush, who was governor of Alexandria, the capital of the Fatimid Caliphate, around 1140. It was created to house his tomb, and now also includes the tombs of other Ottoman officials. In addition, this shrine was dedicated to Sidi Sariya, who was a companion of the Prophet Muhammad. Within the shine, there are cenotaphs and turbans crafted in marble. The shrine is covered by a dome that is much larger than the other domes in the courtyard.

On the western side of the courtyard there is a small dome with several tombs containing marble structures. Tombs are covered with different models of headstone that were prevalent at the time.

The north side of this courtyard contains another entrance that leads to another courtyard of the mosque. This courtyard has a kuttab, and the domes in this area have blue tiles. The complex was completed by a sabil, no longer extant, and a perimeter wall which encompasses other, subsidiary courts and gardens.

See also
  Lists of mosques 
  List of mosques in Africa
  List of mosques in Egypt
  List of Historic Monuments in Cairo

References

External links

 Government Website of Islamic artifacts

16th-century mosques
Mosques in Cairo
Ottoman mosques in Egypt
Mosque buildings with domes
Establishments in Ottoman Egypt
16th-century establishments in Africa